Eois impletaria is a moth in the  family Geometridae. It is found on Mysol and Bali.

References

Moths described in 1866
Eois
Moths of Indonesia